Takhti Khel is a town and union council of Lakki Marwat District in Khyber Pakhtunkhwa province of Pakistan. It is located at 32°48'18N 70°39'12E and has an altitude of 292 metres (961 feet).

References

Union councils of Lakki Marwat District
Populated places in Lakki Marwat District